Rhirid Flaidd (sometimes called Rhirid ap Gwrgenau) (fl. 1160), according to Welsh tradition, was the son of Gwrgenau, who is supported by an obscure pedigree going back to Cunedda Wledig, the progenitor of the House of Cunedda which had provided the kings of Gwynedd from the end of Roman Britain until 825. The appellation of blaidd (wolf) was inherited from his maternal grandmother, Haer, daughter and heiress of Cynfyn, son of Cillyn y Blaidd Rhudd (meaning "Cillyn the Bloody Wolf") of Gest in Eifionydd. He was related through his grandmother to Bleddyn ap Cynfyn, king of Powys who rewarded Gwrgenau with land, presumably for his loyalty and service.

Rhirid, who is said to have inherited his father's lands in Mochnant and Penllyn, Pennant Melangell and Rhiwaedog as well as the maternal inheritance at Gest. He is said to have married Gwenllian, daughter of Ednyfed ap Rhiwallon of Brychdyn, by whom he had two sons, Einion and Madog. From him the following families claimed descent — Lloyds, Fludd, Floyd of Rhiwaedog, the Myddeltons of Gwaenynog and Chirk, the Vaughans of Glan-llyn, and the Lloyds of Glanrafon, Edward of LLanuwchllyn Parish and Ellis of Gwernhefin, Llanycil Parish.  His family tree can best be seen at https://www.ourfamtree.org/browse.php/Lord-of-Penllyn-Rhirid-Flaidd/p669182

References
 Jones Pierce, Professor Thomas, National Library of Wales , Aberystwyth
 Arch. Camb., IV, v, 197-8, V, viii, 197;
 Dwnn, Lewys, Heraldic Visitations of Wales and part of the Marches, 1613
 Yorke, Philip, The Royal Tribes of Wales, 1799
 H.G. (Hendreg. MSS.) 140, 178.
 

Welsh royalty
12th-century Welsh people